The Black Mesa Gravel is a geologic formation in Idaho. It preserves fossils.

See also

 List of fossiliferous stratigraphic units in Idaho
 Paleontology in Idaho

References
 

Geologic formations of Idaho